Josef Kloimstein (1 November 1929 – 15 November 2012) was an Austrian rower who competed in the 1956 Summer Olympics, in the 1960 Summer Olympics, and in the 1964 Summer Olympics.

He was born in Rufling.

In 1956 he and his partner Alfred Sageder won the bronze medal in the coxless pairs event. He also competed with the Austrian boat in the coxed pair competition and was eliminated in the semi-finals.

Four years later he won the silver medal with his partner Alfred Sageder in the coxless pair event.

At the 1964 Games he was part of the Austrian boat which finished eighth in the coxed pair competition.

External links
 Josef Kloimstein's profile at Sports Reference.com

1929 births
2012 deaths
Austrian male rowers
Olympic rowers of Austria
Rowers at the 1956 Summer Olympics
Rowers at the 1960 Summer Olympics
Rowers at the 1964 Summer Olympics
Olympic silver medalists for Austria
Olympic bronze medalists for Austria
Olympic medalists in rowing
Medalists at the 1960 Summer Olympics
Medalists at the 1956 Summer Olympics
European Rowing Championships medalists